Faust So Far, also simply called So Far, is a 1972 album by German krautrock group Faust. This, the band's second studio album, has a more commercially typical structure than its predecessor; it comprises nine separate tracks, each consisting of an individual and distinct musical style or theme.

The album was issued in a black sleeve with black inner sleeve, black labels and a set of inserts with one print for each song on the album.

Critical reception
Trouser Press wrote: "Bizarre little experiments pop up between songs: overlays of effects-treated guitars and the like, sort of a German analogue to the Mothers of Invention’s early sound adventures."

Track listing

Personnel
Werner "Zappi" Diermaier – drums, percussion
Hans Joachim Irmler – organ
Jean-Hervé Péron – vocals, bass guitar
Rudolf Sosna – vocals, electric guitar, keyboards
Gunther Wüsthoff – synthesizer, saxophone

Sound and art work
Kurt Graupner – engineer
Uwe Nettelbeck – producer, album design
Edda Kochl – printing

Release history
Faust So Far was re-issued by Recommended Records in 1979.

References

External links
faust-pages.com. So Far.

1972 albums
Faust (band) albums
Polydor Records albums
Albums produced by Uwe Nettelbeck
Recommended Records albums